Amphistereum is a genus of fungi in the family Auriculariaceae. Species produce cupulate to effused, leathery basidiocarps (fruit bodies) on wood. Microscopically, fruit bodies have a dimitic hyphal system. The genus is currently only known from North and South America.

Taxonomy
The genus was created as a result of molecular research, based on cladistic analysis of DNA sequences, which showed that two species previously referred to the genus Eichleriella formed a related, but distinct grouping.

References

Auriculariales
Agaricomycetes genera